Ode to My Father ("Gukje (International) Market") is a 2014 South Korean drama film directed by Yoon Je-kyoon. Starring Hwang Jung-min and Yunjin Kim, it depicts South Korean history from the 1950s to the present day through the life of an ordinary man, as he experiences events such as the Hungnam evacuation of 1950 during the Korean War, the government's decision to dispatch nurses and miners to West Germany in the 1960s, and the Vietnam War.

It is currently the fourth highest-grossing film in the history of South Korean cinema, with 14.2 million tickets sold.

Plot

During the Hungnam Evacuation of 1950 in the Korean War, when thousands of refugees in what would become North Korea were transported south by U.S. Navy boats, a child, Deok-soo, loses his sister, Mak-soon. Deok-soo's father stays behind to search for her, telling his son to take the boy's mother and two younger siblings to the port city of Busan, where Deok-soo's aunt runs an imported goods store. Before leaving the family, the father makes Deok-soo promise to be head of the household in his place.

Duk-soo becomes his family's breadwinner from an early age, doing all sorts of odd jobs to support the family. In the 1960s, financial need forces him to travel to Europe with his best friend Dal-goo, where they find dangerous work as Gastarbeiter (guest workers) in German coal mines to pay for his brother's tuition at Seoul National University. There, Duk-soo falls in love with a fellow migrant worker, nurse Young-ja. Duk-soo survives a mining accident and leaves Germany after his visa expires. Young-ja returns to Korea months later and tells him she's pregnant with his child. They have a modest wedding, begin a life together, and eventually have two sons.

A few years pass, and Duk-soo's aunt dies. Duk-soo's now elderly uncle is in need of money and decides to sell the imported goods store, a move Duk-soo disagrees with. Duk-soo leaves Korea again in the 1970s for war-torn Vietnam, partly to fulfill his sister's wish for a big wedding by earning enough money to purchase the imported goods store from his uncle. He returns to Korea with a lame leg, the result of getting shot while helping villagers escape from the Viet Cong.

Duk-soo runs the store with his wife, and life goes on until 1983, when major broadcast stations in South Korea run TV programs in which relatives separated during the Korean War are reunited. Duk-soo is contacted to be featured in one of these shows due to the hope of an elderly man from his hometown who claims to be his father. On TV, the two realize they are not father and son. Duk-soo's family is distraught over the mistake, but soon afterward, the same program brings Duk-soo back to TV in the hope of finding his long-lost sister, Mak-soon. A Korean-American woman who was adopted as a child by a U.S. family during the Korean War is featured. Duk-soo converses with her, and realizes she is indeed Mak-soon. An emotional reunion ensues and his sister comes to Korea. Duk-soo's mother passes away soon after the reunion.

In the present day, an elderly Duk-soo finally decides to sell his aunt's imported goods store, which up to this point he stubbornly refused to do despite the store's losing money. It is revealed that Duk-soo's father had promised to reunite with the family at the store, thus explaining why Duk-soo bought and held on to the store for so long. In the final scene, Duk-soo wistfully tells his wife that his father is probably too old at this point to be still alive and reunite with him.

Cast

Hwang Jung-min as Yoon Deok-soo
Yunjin Kim as Young-ja
Oh Dal-su as Dal-goo
Jung Jin-young as Deok-soo's father
Jang Young-nam as Deok-soo's mother
Ra Mi-ran as Deok-soo's paternal aunt
Kim Seul-gi as Kkeut-soon
Lee Hyun as Seung-gyu
Kim Min-jae as Yoon Do-joo
Tae In-ho as Yoon Gi-joo
Hwang Seon-hwa as Yoon Seon-joo
Uhm Ji-seong as young Deok-soo
Jang Dae-woong as young Dal-goo
Shin Rin-ah as young Mak-soon
Lee Ye-eun as Yoon Seo-yeon
Choi Jae-sub as Korean miner 1
Jung Young-ki as Korean miner 2
Yoo Jung-ho as Korean miner 3
Maeng Se-chang as Korean miner 4
Hong Seok-yeon as Deok-soo's uncle
Stella Choe Kim as Mak-soon Yoon
Matthew Douma as Mak-soon's U.S. husband
Jeon So-mi as Mak-soon's eldest daughter
Evelyn Douma as Mak-soon's youngest daughter
Go Yoon as Hyun Bong-hak
Nam Jin-bok as Chung Ju-yung
Park Seon-woong as André Kim
Hwang In-joon as Announcer Kim Dong-geon
Park Young-seo as President of youth organization
Jung Yun-ho as Nam Jin

Production
Ode to My Father was primarily shot in Busan, director Yoon Je-kyoon's hometown where he also shot his previous films Miracle on 1st Street (2007) and Haeundae (2009). It was filmed from 3 September to 25 December 2013, notably at the titular Gukje Market, the biggest open-air street market in Busan that began in the 1950s as a series of stalls set up by wartime refugees seeking to earn a meager living. Overseas locations included the Czech Republic and Thailand (standing in for Germany and Vietnam, respectively). The film's popularity later boosted tourism in Busan, with tours offered of the locations featured in the film, such as Gukje Market; Jagalchi Market; Nampo-dong; and Chojang-dong.

With a  budget, Ode to My Father was the first Korean blockbuster that enforced a standard labor contract with the crew, which stated that they could not work for more than 12 hours a day, and were given overtime pay and a full day off once a week. The cultural, arts and entertainment fields in Korea have typically ignored labor laws and regulations, where deeply rooted tradition causes young staff members to be overworked yet rarely paid. After a long campaign by film professionals, the first Korean film to be made with a standard labor contract was Venus Talk in 2013, but Ode to My Father went further by enforcing the contract from the pre-production stage and ensuring that bonuses will be distributed equally to the entire crew. Director Yoon said production costs rose by  because of the contract, but that people worked harder and more willingly, which ended up elevating the quality of the work.

Release
The film was released in South Korea on 17 December 2014. The film remained No. 1 for five consecutive weeks, despite facing competition from numerous new releases. By 13 January 2015, it recorded 10,001,709 ticket sales, making it the eleventh domestic film (and fourteenth overall) to reach 10 million admissions in the country's history.

In its eighth week of release, Ode to My Father became the second highest-grossing film of all time in the history of South Korean cinema, with 14.2 million admissions. As of 1 March 2015, the film has grossed  in South Korea.

For its North American run, the film premiered in Los Angeles on 31 December 2014 where it drew over 6,000 viewers after four days of release, mostly first-generation Korean-American immigrants in their fifties and older. Beginning 9 January 2015, it expanded to 43 US and Canadian cities such as New York City, Chicago, Washington D.C., Boston, Seattle, Toronto, and Vancouver.

It was also screened in the Panorama section of the 65th Berlin International Film Festival in February 2015, and among the audience were 20 ethnic Korean first-generation immigrants whose experiences were portrayed in the film.

Critical reception
The film drew mixed reviews and raised controversy over its alleged attempt to idealize the past under the rule of authoritarian regimes. This began when President Park Geun-hye stressed the need for patriotism by citing a scene in the film in which the husband and wife suddenly halt an argument and pay a hand salute to the national flag when they hear the national anthem playing. Several film and culture critics lambasted it as a "conservative" or "right-wing" film that glorified industrialization, though liberal opposition lawmaker Moon Jae-in disagreed, saying "that was the reality of that time period." Critic Huh Ji-woong said that it "emphasizes the sacrifices of seniors while their current lackadaisical attitudes should be identified as a real problem," while critic Chin Jung-kwon said the film amounts to a "low-class tearjerker."

Despite the lukewarm reception from critics, the film continued to be popular among audiences. Critic Jeong Ji-wuk said the political debate ironically aided the film's box office, "It was able to top 10 million in attendance with the combination of various factors, such as being a story of a family and a father, curiosity caused by political debates and an aggressive marketing strategy of CJ Entertainment." Nostalgia was also believed to be the driving force behind its commercial success, with middle-aged viewers in their forties and older taking up 34.5 percent of ticket sales (despite the film's relative absence of buzz on social media). Critic Kim Hyung-seok said, "Audiences who lived around the era in which Deok-soo lived will feel like that the movie is an ode to themselves and feel nostalgic and comfort."

Director Yoon, however, said he intentionally excluded any political point of view in the film and "just wanted to talk about his father and his generation, who sacrificed themselves for their children" and "make a family movie that could be watched together by three generations." Calling the film his personal tribute to his father (he used his parents' real names Deok-soo and Young-ja for the lead characters), Yoon said, "My father passed away when I was in college and I didn't have a chance to say thank you. I hope the film serves as the channel for communication between the old and young generation."

Adaptations
An Indian film adaptation Bharat starring Salman Khan, Katrina Kaif and Sunil Grover directed by Ali Abbas Zafar was released on 5 June 2019.

Awards and nominations

References

External links
 
 

2014 films
South Korean war drama films
2010s Korean-language films
Films shot in the Czech Republic
Films shot in Thailand
CJ Entertainment films
South Korean films remade in other languages
2010s South Korean films